American Heart is a studio album by American band Adrenalin. It was released in 1984 by Rocshire Records. The only single was "Faraway Eyes" (#28 in the U.S. Rock Tracks).

Track listing
A Side

B Side

Chart performance

Album

Singles

References

Adrenalin (band) albums
1984 albums
Albums produced by Vini Poncia